Nyköping County, or Nyköpings län, was a county of the Swedish Empire from 1634 to 1683. It was one of three counties in the province of Södermanland, and in 1683 they were merged into Södermanland County.

See also 
List of governors of Södermanland County
Gripsholm County
Eskilstunahus County

Former counties of Sweden
1634 establishments in Sweden